Julia Saly (born Julia Salinero) is a retired Spanish film actress and producer. She worked on many films over the years with acclaimed Spanish horror filmmaker Paul Naschy and was one of his favorite actresses. Her career ended in 1985, when Naschy's film production company Aconito Films went out of business. Her nickname was La Pocha, which translates roughly as "White Girl", named after a character she played in a 1979 film called Madrid al desnudo. She has one son, Cristian B. Salinero, born July 8, 1983, also known as Berrebe or Cristian Saly, who is a singer, songwriter and digital audio engineer.

Career
Julia Saly has played roles in a multitude of horror film subgenres, such as witchcraft films, vampire films, werewolf films, historical horror films, ghost films, seamonster films, and zombie films. She has been described as being among the "who's who" of the Spanish horror film industry. She is also known for her multiple collaborations with actor and film director Paul Naschy. 
In addition to her work as an actress, Saly has also served as a producer on films such as The Craving, and The Beast and the Magic Sword.

Filmography

References

Bibliography
 Jones, Stephen. The Essential Monster Movie Guide: A Century of Creature Features on Film, TV, and Video. Billboard Books, 2000.

External links

Spanish film actresses
Spanish film producers
Year of birth missing (living people)
Living people